Chaturmasya, also rendered Chāturmāsa, is a holy period of four months, beginning on Shayani Ekadashi (June-July) and ending on Prabodhini Ekadashi (October-November) in Hinduism. This period also coincides with the monsoon season in India.

Chaturmasya is reserved for penance, austerities, fasting, bathing in holy rivers and religious observances for all. Devotees resolve to observe some form of vow, be it of silence or abstaining from a favourite food item, or having only a single meal a day.

Etymology
Chaturmasya literally means "four months", derived from the Sanskrit catur (चतुर्), "four", and māsa (मासः), "month".

Hinduism

Legend 
Chaturmasya begins on the eleventh day of the Hindu lunar month of Ashadha or Devashayani Ekadashi. This is celebrated as the day that the deity Vishnu falls asleep on his serpent, Shesha, for a period of four months and wakes up on Prabodhini Ekadashi. This is associated with the story of King Bali and Vishnu's incarnation as Vamana. Bali, the king of demons, had seized power from the Indra (the king of the gods) and was ruling over the entire universe. The gods sought shelter from Vishnu to regain their power. Vishnu incarnated as Vamana, a dwarf, and asked Bali for 3 steps of land. As soon as Bali obliged, Vamana assumed a gigantic form. With his first step, he covered the entire earth, and with his second step he covered the mid-world. Since there was no place for his third step, Bali suggested that Vamana place it on his head. Vamana was pleased with him and granted him a boon, and with his third step, sent Bali to Patala(netherworld). According to the boon, Bali requested Vamana or Vishnu to live with him in Patala. Vishnu obliged which worried all of the deities, including the goddess Lakshmi (Vishnu's consort). Lakshmi then devised a plan which only allowed Vishnu to live with Bali for a certain duration. This duration is also known as Chaturmasya or the period that Vishnu "sleeps" while visiting King Bali.

Observances 
 

Chaturmasya, inauspicious for weddings and other celebrations, is a suitable time for householders to have an annual renewal of faith by listening to discourses on dharma, and by meditation and vrata (self-control). Penance, austerities, religious observances, recital of mantras, bathing in holy rivers, performing sacrifices, and charity are prescribed. Fasts and purity during this period help maintain health, for which there is likely a scientific rationale, disease spreading more readily with the onset of monsoon. A number of Hindus, particularly those  following the Vaishnava tradition, refrain from eating onions and garlic during this period. In Maharashtra, a number of Hindu families also do not eat any eggplant (brinjal/aubergine) preparations.
The sanyasis or ascetics observe Chaturmasya for four fortnights, beginning on full moon day of the month of Ashadha, also known as Guru Purnima or Vyas Purnima, and ending on full moon day of the month of Bhadrapada. Sanyasis are supposed to halt at one place during this period.

Celebrations
Major Celebrations within this holy period include:
 Guru Purnima
 Krishna Janmashtami
 Raksha Bandhan
 Ganesh Chaturthi
 Navaratri (Dasahra – Durga Puja – Vijayadashami) 
 Diwali
 Champa Sashthi (Margashirsha bright 6th ) - Per custom in Maharashtra, Chaturmasya ends on this day.

Jainism
In Jainism this practice is collectively known as Varshayog and is prescribed for Jain monasticism. Wandering monks such as mendicants and ascetics in Jainism, believe that during the rainy season, countless bugs, insects and tiny creatures that cannot be seen in the naked eye take birth massively. Therefore, these monks  reduce the amount of harm they do to other creatures so they opt to stay in a single place for the four months to incur minimal harm to other lives. These monks, who generally do not stay in one place for long(59 nights for females, 29 nights for males), observe their annual 'Rains Retreat' during this period, by living in one place during the entire period amidst lay people, observing a vow of silence (mauna), meditation, fasting and other austerities, and also giving religious discourses to the local public.

During the four-month rainy-season period, when the mendicants must stay in one place, the chief sadhu of every group gives a daily sermon (pravacana, vyakhyana), attended mostly by women and older, retired men, but on special days by most of the lay congregation. During their eight months of travel, the sadhus give sermons whenever requested, most often when they come to a new village or town in their travels.

One of the most important Jain festivals, Paryushana, falls during the beginning of this period, which concludes with Forgiveness Day, Kshamavani Diwas, wherein lay people and disciples say Micchami Dukkadam and ask forgiveness from each other. Amongst Jain merchants, there is a tradition of inviting monks to their respective cities during Chaturmasya to give religious instruction.

In Jainism, the third part of the classical Jain text Kalpa Sutra, written by Bhadrabahu I in the 1st century AD, deals with rules for ascetics and laws during the four months (chaturmas) of the rainy season, when ascetics temporarily abandon their wandering life and settle down amidst the laity. This is the time when the festival of Paryushan is celebrated and the Kalpasutra is traditionally recited.

Buddhism
Gautama Buddha stayed at the royal garden of King Bimbisara of Rajgir, whom he had recently converted, for the period of Chaturmasya and gave sermons: this practice is followed by monks to this day. Another reason for ascetics to stay in one place during the rainy season is that the tropical climate produces a large number of insects, which would be trampled by travelling monks.

Vassa is varsha-vas i.e. three-month annual stay observed by Theravada monks. It begins with Asalha Puja. At the end of Bassa, during Kathina, new robes are donated by the laity to the monks.

Notes

References

External links
 Jain Chaturmasya begins

Hindu festivals
Vrata
Jain practices
Hindi words and phrases
Religious festivals in India
 
July observances
August observances
September observances
October observances
November observances